Thank You Good Night Sold Out is a live album by The Dears, released in 2004 on MapleMusic Recordings.

Track listing
 "Autotomy" – 11:17
 "C'Était pour la passion" – 5:28
 "End of a Hollywood Bedtime Story" – 5:58
 "Who Are You, Defenders of the Universe?" – 4:17
 "22: The Death of All the Romance" – 6:24
 "Warm and Sunny Days" – 7:11
 "Lost in the Plot" – 5:26
 "Pinned Together, Falling Apart" – 22:01

References

The Dears albums
2004 live albums
MapleMusic Recordings live albums